The Broxbourne Council election, 1999 was held to elect council members of the Broxbourne Borough Council, the local government authority of the borough of Broxbourne, Hertfordshire, England.

Composition of expiring seats before election

Election results

Results summary 
An "all out" election was held in 13 wards on 6 May 1999.

This was the first Borough election since the 1998 Boundary Commission report that had reduced the council size from 14 to 13 wards and from 42 to 38 Councillors.

12 wards returned 3 Councillors, the smaller Rosedale Ward returned 2 Councillors.

With the exception of Hoddesdon Town Ward all of the remaining wards had experienced boundary changes since the last election in 1998.

The political balance of the new council following this election was:

Conservative 33 seats
Labour 5 seats

The 5 seats won by Labour proved to be their largest representation achieved under the 1999 boundaries.

Ward results

References

1999
1999 English local elections
1990s in Hertfordshire